Auterrive is a commune in the Pyrénées-Atlantiques department in the Nouvelle-Aquitaine region of south-western France.

The inhabitants of the commune are known as Auterriverains or Auterriveraines.

Geography
Auterrive is located some 14 km south-east of Peyrehorade and 7 km west of Salies-de-Béarn. Access to the commune is by the D29 road from Carresse-Cassaber in the north which passes just west of the village and continues south-west to Labastide-Villefranche. Access to the village is by local roads connecting to the D29. The D28 road goes south from Saint-Dos through the west of the commune and continues to Escos in the south. The D277 goes from the D29 just west to the village west to Saint-Dos. Apart from forest along the river bank and some small forests in the west of the commune the land is all farmland.

Auterrive is a Gascon village, which fully depended on Dax and is nowhere mentioned as Bearnais. Paul Raymond reported a record from 1675 when the village was referred to as Autarrive en France. Pierre-Tucoo Chala indicated a peculiarity concerning Carresse-Cassaber: the Auterrive bridge is not on the border but Gascony had a bridgehead on the right bank of the Gave d'Oloron on what is now the territory of the Béarnais village of Carresse. This area did not touch the river at the bridge and purists could say that the béarnais commune of today has incorporated a few hectares of Gascon land.

The commune is in the drainage basin of the Adour. The area east of the village is an island enclosed by a loop of the Gave d'Oloron and a stream which crosses the loop (although the Gave d'Oloron is not the border of the commune).

Places and hamlets

 Boucau
 Le Désert
 Dumirail
 Durancou
 Labarthe
 Lahosse
 Larribère (Mill)
 Maysonnave
 Minoterie
 Noutary
 Terrenabe

Neighbouring communes and villages

Toponymy
The commune name in béarnais is Autarriba. For Michel Grosclaude the origin of the name is unquestionably Gascon, auta arriba from the Latin alta ripa meaning "high river".

The following table details the origins of the commune name and other names in the commune.

Sources:

Raymond: Topographic Dictionary of the Department of Basses-Pyrenees, 1863, on the page numbers indicated in the table. 
Grosclaude: Toponymic Dictionary of communes, Béarn, 2006 
Cassini: Cassini Map from 1750

Origins:

Bayonne: Cartulary of Bayonne or Livre d'Or (Book of Gold)
Came: Titles of Came 
Notaries: Notaries of Labastide-Villefranche
Reformation: Reformation of Béarn

History
Paul Raymond noted on page 17 of his 1863 dictionary that Auterrive depended on the sub-delegation of Dax.

Heraldry

Administration

List of Successive Mayors

Inter-communality
The commune is part of seven inter-communal structures:
 the Communauté de communes du Béarn des Gaves;
 the SIGOM;
 the SIVU of five villages;
 the SIVU for educational regrouping of Léren, Saint-Pé-de-Léren, Saint-Dos et Auterrive;
 the Energy association of Pyrénées-Atlantiques;
 the inter-communal association for the management of drinking water from the Saleys and its Gaves;
 the inter-communal association for Gaves and the Saleys;

Demography
In 2017 the commune had 130 inhabitants.

Economy
The commune is part of the Appellation d'origine contrôlée (AOC) zone of Ossau-iraty.

Culture and Heritage

Civil heritage
At the foot of the Gave there is the Barry fortress which was an observation and border post between Navarre, Béarn, and Gascony. This small enclosure had a garrison of three soldiers until 1682. The currently existing ruins, although based on much older foundations, seem to date back to the Hundred Years War when Auterrive was occupied by the English and attached to the Seneschal of Hastings.
The Maisonnabe House in the Mirails district dates to 1661;
The Pouey House is an old manor house of justice
The Hau House is a former dependency of the Abbey of Sorde.

There is a small enamelled plate which says "June 1875" that recalls the flood which swept away the village bridge killing two people in that year.

Religious heritage
The Church dates from the 16th century.
There are several Calvaries including a cross of Saint-Michel which formerly marked the boundaries of the Abbey of Sorde.
There was a Chapel in the Mirails district which was recently destroyed.

Environmental heritage
Lake Dumirail is south-west of the commune.

Amenities
There is a holiday and leisure centre at Auterrive (Les Francas).

Notable people linked to the commune
The Marquise de Montehermoso (1784 to 1869), born Countess Maria-Pilar d'Acedo, Countess of Echauz, widow of the Marquis of the same name and mistress of Joseph Bonaparte, King of Spain, married in the village to Amédée of Carabène, the holder of numerous French and foreign decorations, future general counsel and senior officer of the Napoleonic campaigns. She was also the owner of Barry, the fortified site in the village.

See also
Communes of the Pyrénées-Atlantiques department

Bibliography
Alexis Ichas, History of Auterrive - Vols. I & II, Éditions Atlantica 
Alexis Ichas, History of gaves, Éditions Atlantica 
Alexis Ichas, Béarnais Chronicles of gave and the Saleys, Éditions Atlantica, 2006

References

External links
Auterrive on Géoportail, National Geographic Institute (IGN) website 
Hauterive on the 1750 Cassini Map

Communes of Pyrénées-Atlantiques